Charters is a surname. Notable people with the surname include:

 Ann Charters (born 1936), American professor of English
 Charlie Charters (born 1968), former English rugby union official and sports marketing executive
 Frank Charters, (1884–1953), English cricketer
 Harvey Charters (1912–1995), Canadian canoer
 James Christian Charters a.k.a. DJ Ironik (born 1988), British musician, DJ and rapper
 John Charters, former New Zealand rower
 Keith Charters (born 1965), British author
 Samuel Charters (Canadian politician) (1863–1943), Ontario newspaper publisher and politician
 Samuel Charters (1929–2015), American music historian and writer
 Spencer Charters (1875–1943), American film actor

See also
 Charter (disambiguation)